The Seven Boyars were a group of Russian nobles who deposed Tsar Vasily Shuisky on 17 July 1610 and, later that year, invited the Poles into Moscow.

The seven were Princes Fedor Mstislavsky (the leader of the group), Ivan Mikhailovich Vorotynskii, Andrei Vasilevich Trubetskoi, Andrei Vasilevich Golitsyn, Boris Mikhailovich Lykov-Obolenskii, and Boyars Ivan Nikitich Romanov and Fedor Ivanovich Sheremetev.  Due to the Polish advance into Russia, the Bolotnikov rebellion, and other unrest during the Time of Troubles, Shuisky was never very popular, nor was he able to effectively rule outside of the capital itself.  The seven deposed him and he was forcibly tonsured a monk in the Chudov Monastery in the Kremlin.  He was later carried off to Poland where he died in prison at Gostynin in 1612.

On 17/27 August, the seven agreed to accept Władysław as Tsar of Russia.  The Poles entered the city on 21 September.  While some consider the rule of the Seven in Moscow to have lasted only from about June 1610 until the arrival of the Poles in September, others consider their rule to have lasted until the Poles were driven from Moscow by the popular movement headed by Kuzma Minin, Prince Dmitry Pozharsky, and Prince Dmitry Troubetskoy in 1612.  Their power to act after September 1610, however, was rather nominal.

See also
Polish–Muscovite War (1605–1618)
Time of Troubles
Semibankirschina

References

1610 in Russia
Time of Troubles